Suit of Cups may refer to: 

 Cups (suit), one of the four suits in Latin-suited playing cards
 Suit of goblets, one of the four suits in a cartomantic Tarot pack